The Sora no Manimani anime television series is based on the manga of the same name written and illustrated by Mami Kashiwabara. The episodes, produced by Studio Comet, are directed and written by Shinji Takamatsu, and features character design by Hajime Watanabe who based the designs on Kashiwabara's original concept. The story focuses on Saku Ōyagi, a quiet bookworm who moves back to his old town and meets his childhood friend Mihoshi Akeno, though Saku initially does not want to even see her. After they manage to repair their friendship, Saku joins the astronomy club that Mihoshi is a member of.

Twelve episodes were produced which aired in Japan from July 7 to September 22, 2009 on AT-X. Six DVD compilation volumes were released by Sony Pictures Entertainment between September 2, 2009 and January 20, 2010. Two pieces of theme music are used for the episodes; one opening theme and one ending theme.


Episode list

References

External links
Anime official website 

Sora no Manimani